The Orange Ridge, DeLand and Atlantic Railroad was a railroad in Central Florida, United States, linking DeLand with the main line of the Jacksonville, Tampa and Key West Railway (now the CSX Sanford Subdivision). It opened in 1884. The line is still operated by CSX as their DeLand Spur.

Florida state law chapter 3332, approved 1880, incorporated the Orange Ridge, DeLand and Atlantic Railroad Company.

Florida state law chapter 3646, approved February 16, 1885, extended the time limit for completion to January 1, 1888.

References

Defunct Florida railroads
Predecessors of the Atlantic Coast Line Railroad
Railway companies established in 1880
Railway companies disestablished in 1886
1880 establishments in Florida